Kinyongia vanheygeni, the Poroto single-horned chameleon or Van Heygen's chameleon, is a species of chameleon, a lizard in the family Chamaeleonidae.

Geographic range
Kinyongia vanheygeni is native to the Ngozi Crater in the Poroto Mountains of Tanzania.

Etymology
Kinyongia vanheygeni was named after Belgian herpetologist Emmanuel Van Heygen, who took the first pictures of it in the wild.

References

Further reading
Nečas P (2009). "Ein neues Chamäleon der Gattung Kinyongia Tilbury, Tolley & Branch 2006 aus den Poroto-Bergen Süd-Tansania (Reptilia: Sauria: Chamaeleonidae) [= A new chameleon of the genus Kinyongia Tilbury, Tolley & Branch 2006 from the Poroto Mountains, southern Tanzania (Reptilia: Sauria: Chamaeleonidae)]". Sauria 31 (2): 41–48. (Kinyongia vanheygeni, new species). (in German).

Kinyongia
Lizards of Africa
Reptiles described in 2009
Reptiles of Tanzania
Endemic fauna of Tanzania